USS Pembina is a name used more than once by the U.S. Navy:

 , a gunboat commissioned 16 October 1861
 , a cargo ship commissioned 25 May 1945

United States Navy ship names